States Rights Gist (September 3, 1831 – November 30, 1864) was a lawyer, a militia general in South Carolina, and a Confederate Army brigadier general who served during the American Civil War. A relative of several prominent South Carolinians, Gist rose to fame during the war but was killed at the Battle of Franklin on November 30, 1864. His name was based on the Southern states' rights doctrine of nullification politics of his father, Nathaniel Gist. Nathaniel Gist was a disciple of John C. Calhoun and chose his son's name to reflect his own political sentiments.

Early life and education
Known to his family as "States", Gist was born in 1831 in Union, South Carolina, to Nathaniel Gist and Elizabeth Lewis McDaniel. He was distantly related to Mordecai Gist, a general in the Continental Army during the American Revolution. He graduated from South Carolina College, now the University of South Carolina.  

After Gist graduated Harvard Law School, he moved home to Union, read the law with an established firm and passed the bar. He set up a law practice.

Personal life
In 1863, Gist married Jane Margaret Adams, the daughter of South Carolina Governor James Hopkins Adams.

Antebellum state militia and governor's office service
Soon after his return to South Carolina in 1853, Gist served in the state militia as captain of a volunteer company. He became aide-de-camp to Governor James Hopkins Adams in 1854. 

By April 1856 Gist was appointed as a brigadier general in the South Carolina Militia. One of his many roles was to train fellow militia members for war. 

His older cousin, William Henry Gist, who served as governor between 1858 and 1860, appointed States Rights Gist as "especial" aide-de-camp. General Gist moved to Columbia to become part of his cousin the governor's household. 

In April 1860, States Gist resigned from the militia and became a full–time advisor to Governor Gist. In October 1860, the governor sent his cousin to six other governors of Southern states to seek support for secession due to the likely election of Abraham Lincoln as the next President of the United States.

Civil War service

Fort Sumter
In January 1861, after South Carolina had seceded from the Union on December 20, 1860, the new governor Francis Pickens appointed Gist as state adjutant and inspector general. In this capacity, Gist acquired weapons and mobilized military manpower throughout the state. He also briefly oversaw operations in preparation for the state's occupation of the harbor of Charleston and the federal Fort Sumter. 

The new Confederate government took over this operation in February 1861 and appointed General P. G. T. Beauregard to command it. Gist accompanied Pickens and Beauregard for the raising of state and Confederate flags over Fort Sumter after its surrender on April 14, 1861.

First Manassas
In July 1861, Gist was assigned by General Joseph E. Johnston to the Confederate Army of the Potomac as a volunteer aide-de-camp to another South Carolina general, Brig. Gen. Barnard Bee, and accompanied Bee on July 20, 1861 to the First Battle of Manassas. Bee was killed during the battle soon after giving Stonewall Jackson his famous nickname. General Beauregard assigned Gist to lead the 4th Alabama Regiment after Bee and the regiment's Colonel Jones were killed in the battle. Gist himself was slightly wounded.

Coastal defenses
After the Battle of First Manassas, Gist returned to Columbia to prepare state forces to defend Port Royal in the fall of 1861 and to be absorbed into the Confederate Army in winter 1862. On March 20, 1862, through the influence of Confederate Senator James Chesnut of South Carolina (the husband of Mary Chesnut, who became known as a diarist of the war and its effect on planter society), Gist was appointed a brigadier general in the Confederate Army. He commanded the James Island military district and a brigade in coastal defenses between May 1862 and May 1863.

Gist was third in command of Confederate forces at the Battle of Secessionville in June 1862, commanded troops sent to oppose a landing by Union forces at Pocotaligo, South Carolina in October 1862, led a small division of reinforcements in North Carolina between December 1862 and January 1863, and was present at the Union naval attack on Charleston on April 7, 1863. He was not personally involved in combat operations at any of these battles or events.

Vicksburg
In May 1863, Gist and Brig. Gen. W.H.T. Walker led two brigades of South Carolina troops to reinforce Confederate forces under Gen. Joseph E. Johnston in Mississippi. They were trying to relieve Confederate forces under attack at Vicksburg by the Union Army, then commanded by Major General Ulysses S. Grant in a push to take the fortress city to gain control of the Mississippi River. 

After arriving in Mississippi, Walker was promoted to major general and Gist's brigade was placed in Walker's division. They participated in the Vicksburg Campaign and the Battle of Jackson, Mississippi. Johnston's efforts in the Vicksburg Campaign were unsuccessful and the fortress city fell to the Union Army under General Grant on July 4, 1863.

Chickamauga, Chattanooga
After the Vicksburg Campaign, in August 1863 Walker's division was sent to Chattanooga, Tennessee to join General Braxton Bragg's Army of Tennessee. Gist's brigade was stationed first at Rome, Georgia, but on September 17, 1863, Gist was ordered to return with his brigade to Walker's division. 

Gist and his men arrived at the Battle of Chickamauga on the morning of September 20, 1863 to find that Gist had to take command of the division because Walker was in temporary command of a corps. Gist's brigade lost 170 men in 45 minutes as they tried to plug a hole in the line of Maj. Gen. John C. Breckinridge.
 
Gist again commanded Walker's division during the Third Battle of Chattanooga in November 1863. The division served as the rear guard for the retreat of Breckinridge's corps from Missionary Ridge. While many of Bragg's principal subordinates opposed him during the turmoil in the Army of Tennessee in the fall of 1863, Walker and Gist remained loyal to Bragg.

Atlanta
Gist's brigade remained with Walker's division during the Atlanta Campaign. During the Battle of Atlanta Walker was killed and Gist was wounded in a hand on July 22, 1864. On July 24, 1864, Walker's division was broken up and Gist's brigade was assigned to the division of Maj. Gen. Benjamin F. Cheatham. Gist returned to duty a month later after recuperating from his wound.

Franklin-Nashville Campaign
After the Battle of Atlanta, Gist commanded a brigade under Maj. Gen. John C. Brown during Lt. Gen. John Bell Hood's Franklin-Nashville Campaign.

Death at Franklin

Gist was shot in the chest while leading his brigade in a charge against U.S. fortifications at the Battle of Franklin on November 30, 1864. He was leading the brigade on foot after his horse had been shot. Two sources state that he died of his wounds soon after at a field hospital in Franklin, Tennessee but two others state that he was killed instantly on the battlefield. He was one of twelve Confederate generals who were casualties that day, six of them killed in action.

Gist had proven to be a brave and competent soldier who trained his men well and could be trusted with commands higher than his nominal grade. He is buried in the Trinity Episcopal churchyard in downtown Columbia, South Carolina.

See also

List of American Civil War generals (Confederate)

Notes

References
 Cisco, Walter Brian. States Rights Gist: A South Carolina General of the Civil War. Shippensburg, PA: White Mane Publishing Co., 1991. .
 Eicher, John H., and David J. Eicher. Civil War High Commands. Stanford, CA: Stanford University Press, 2001. .
 McWhiney, Grady, and Perry D. Jamieson. Attack and Die: Civil War Military Tactics and the Southern Heritage. Tuscaloosa: University of Alabama Press, 1982. .
 Heidler, David S., and Jeanne T. Heidler, eds. Encyclopedia of the American Civil War: A Political, Social, and Military History. New York: W. W. Norton & Company, 2000. .
 Macmillan. The Confederacy: Selections from the Four-Volume Macmillan Encyclopedia of the Confederacy. New York: Simon & Schuster Macmillan, 1993, introductory material, 1998. .
 Sifakis, Stewart. Who Was Who in the Civil War. New York: Facts On File, 1988. .
 Warner, Ezra J. Generals in Gray: Lives of the Confederate Commanders. Baton Rouge: Louisiana State University Press, 1959. .

External links
 

1831 births
1864 deaths
People from Union, South Carolina
Harvard Law School alumni
Confederate States Army brigadier generals
Confederate militia generals
People of South Carolina in the American Civil War
Confederate States of America military personnel killed in the American Civil War
University of South Carolina alumni